An LGBT film festival or queer film festival is a specialized film festival that has an LGBTQ+ focus in its selection of films. LGBT film festivals often screen films that would struggle to find a mainstream audience and are often activist spaces for awareness-raising around LGBT rights as well as for community building among queer communities.

The first LGBT-focused film festivals were organized in the United States as part of the awakening LGBT movement in the United States in the 1970s. The longest-running film festival with an LGBT focus is the Frameline Film Festival in San Francisco, which was established in 1977. Until the 1990s, LGBT film festivals were mostly informal screenings in Western countries. In the 1990s, NGOs were founded to create and promote queer-focused film festivals and festivals became more commercialized. Around this time, more queer-focused film festivals began to emerge, especially in East Asia and Eastern Europe.

LGBT film festivals use different labels to promote their focus on LGBT topics, for instance "gay and lesbian" (such as the Hong Kong Lesbian & Gay Film Festival); "queer" (such as the Asian Queer Film Festival); "rainbow" (such as the Rainbow Reel Tokyo); "LGBT", "LGBTQ", and other variations of the acronym (such as the Connecticut LGBTQ Film Festival); or they might not use a label in their name at all (such as the MIX NYC).

In 2020, several queer film festivals—Los Angeles' Outfest, the New York Lesbian, Gay, Bisexual, & Transgender Film Festival, Toronto's Inside Out Film and Video Festival, and San Francisco's Frameline Film Festival—partnered to launch the North American Queer Festival Alliance, an initiative to further publicize and promote LGBT film.

List

References

Lists of film festivals
LGBT-related lists